Pakri Peninsula extends from northwestern mainland Estonia's Harju County into the Baltic Sea. Its length is 12 km and its area is about 40 km2.

Portions of the peninsula were protected in 1998 as the Pakri Landscape Conservation Area on the basis of its unique geological features, valuable communities of flora and fauna, and historic interest.

The port town of Paldiski is located on the peninsula.

Footnotes

References

Lichens and their substrate preferences on the Pakri Peninsula (Northwest Estonia) . University of Tartu.

Peninsulas of Estonia
Landforms of Harju County